OpenVAS (Open Vulnerability Assessment System, originally known as GNessUs) is the scanner component of Greenbone Vulnerability Manager (GVM), a software framework of several services and tools offering vulnerability scanning and vulnerability management.

All Greenbone Vulnerability Manager products are free software, and most components are licensed under the GNU General Public License (GPL). Plugins for Greenbone Vulnerability Manager are written in the Nessus Attack Scripting Language, NASL.

History 
Greenbone Vulnerability Manager began under the name of OpenVAS, and before that the name GNessUs, as a fork of the previously open source Nessus scanning tool, after its developers Tenable Network Security changed it to a proprietary (closed source) license in October 2005. OpenVAS was originally proposed by pentesters at SecuritySpace, discussed with pentesters at Portcullis Computer Security  and then announced by Tim Brown on Slashdot. 

Greenbone Vulnerability Manager is a member project of Software in the Public Interest.

Structure

There is a daily updated feed of Network Vulnerability Tests (NVTs)  over 50,000 in total (as of July 2020).

Documentation
The OpenVAS protocol structure aims to be well-documented to assist developers. The OpenVAS Compendium is a publication of the OpenVAS Project that delivers documentation on OpenVAS.

See also

 Aircrack-ng
 BackBox
 BackTrack
 Kali Linux
 Kismet (software)
List of free and open-source software packages
 Metasploit Project
 Nmap
 ZMap (software)

References

External links 
 
 OpenVAS, Nikto Nmap, OWASP Zed Attack Proxy (ZAP) all in one
 OpenVAS, Nessus and NexPose Tested
 OpenVAS Protocol Documentation
 OpenVAS Compendium - A Publication of The OpenVAS Project

Free security software
Network analyzers
2005 software
Pentesting software toolkits